Tramar Sutherland  (born 23 March 1989) is a Canadian professional basketball player  who last played for the KW Titans of the NBL Canada.

College career 
After playing high school basketball at Father Henry Carr Catholic School in Toronto, Ontario, Sutherland began his college career at South Plains College. He was a two-year starter and was named to the All-Defensive Team twice. Sutherland transferred to the University of Arkansas at Little Rock to play with the Trojans, and he graduated from the school in 2012. With the Trojans, Sutherland advanced to the NCAA Men's Division I Basketball Championship. In 2012, Sutherland was a part of the UALR Trojans winning the west division regular season record.

Professional career 
In 2014, Sutherland started his career in the National Basketball League of Canada for the Moncton Miracles. In his second year as a professional basketball player, he played with the Niagara River Lions. He was awarded the Iron Man player award for the season. Sutherland is currently a member of the Kitchener Waterloo Titans in the National Basketball League of Canada. In the 2018-19 season, Sutherland averaged 10 points, 4.2 rebounds, and 1.2 assists per game. He was named to the All-Canadian Third Team. He was one of four returning players for the KW Titans in 2019.

References 

1989 births
Living people
Canadian expatriate basketball people in the United States
Canadian men's basketball players
KW Titans players
Little Rock Trojans men's basketball players
Moncton Miracles players
Niagara River Lions players
South Plains Texans basketball players
Basketball players from Toronto
Shooting guards